Mordellistena micans is a species of beetle in the family Mordellidae, part of the superfamily Tenebrionoidea. It was discovered in 1817 and can be found in Austria, Bosnia and Herzegovina, Croatia, Hungary, Italy, Slovenia, Spain, and European part of Turkey.

References

micans
Beetles described in 1817
Beetles of Europe